Byrdbreen is, at about  long and  wide, the largest glacier flowing northwest between Mount Bergersen and Balchen Mountain in the Sør Rondane Mountains. It was mapped by Norwegian cartographers in 1957 from air photos taken by U.S. Navy Operation Highjump, 1946–47, and named for Rear Admiral Richard E. Byrd, U.S. Navy, commander of U.S. Navy Operation Highjump.

See also
 Glaciology
 Hjelmkalven Point
 Krakken Hill
 List of glaciers in the Antarctic

References 

 

Glaciers of Queen Maud Land
Princess Ragnhild Coast